Hunter Street is a comedy adventure television series created by Reint Schölvinck and Melle Runderkamp that aired on Nickelodeon from March 11, 2017 to February 23, 2018, and on TeenNick from July 29 to September 27, 2019. The series stars Stony Blyden, Mae Mae Renfrow, Kyra Smith, Thomas Jansen, and Daan Creyghton as a group of five foster children who must solve a mystery in order to find their missing foster parents. Wilson Radjou-Pujalte and Kate Bensdorp join the cast in the series' second season, and Eliyha Altena and Sarah Nauta join the cast in the series' third season.

Series overview

Episodes

Season 1 (2017)

Season 2 (2018)

Season 3 (2019)

Season 4 (2021)

Special (2017)

Notes

References 

Lists of American children's television series episodes
Lists of American comedy television series episodes
Lists of Nickelodeon television series episodes